Axel Müller (born 3 January 1992 in Genolier, Switzerland) is a Swiss archer. He competed in the individual event at the 2012 Summer Olympics.

References 

Swiss male archers
1992 births
Living people
Archers at the 2012 Summer Olympics
Olympic archers of Switzerland
Archers at the 2010 Summer Youth Olympics
People from Nyon District
Sportspeople from the canton of Vaud